Antiplanes profundicola is a species of sea snail, a marine gastropod mollusk in the family Pseudomelatomidae.

Description
The length of the shell attains 30 mm, its diameter 10.4 mm.

Distribution
This marine species occurs from the Arctic to California, USA.

References

External links
  Bartsch, P, Some turrid mollusks of Monterey Bay and vicinity; Proceedings of the Biological Society of Washington, v. 57 p. 57-68
 
 

profundicola
Gastropods described in 1944